K-50 or K50 may refer to:

Vehicles
Automobiles
 K-50 truck, an American military truck
 Karry K50, a Chinese compact MPV
 Qiantu K50, a Chinese battery-electric supercar

Ships
 , a corvette of the Royal Navy

Other uses
 K50 Airstrip, in Lower Shabelle, Somalia
 K-50M, a Vietnamese submachine gun
 Bastien und Bastienne, by Wolfgang Amadeus Mozart
 Otanoshike Station, in Hokkaido, Japan
 Pentax K-50, a digital camera
 Potassium-50, an isotope of potassium
 Redmi K50, a smartphone
 Toyota K50 transmission